Unkida is a rural locality (a selo) in Rugudzhinsky Selsoviet, Gunibsky District, Republic of Dagestan, Russia. The population was 432 as of 2010.

Geography 
Unkida is located 20 km southwest of Gunib (the district's administrative centre) by road, on the Betsor River. Kulla and Batsada are the nearest rural localities.

References 

Rural localities in Gunibsky District